Year 1334 (MCCCXXXIV) was a common year starting on Saturday (link will display the full calendar) of the Julian calendar.

Events 
 January–December 
 July 18 – The bishop of Florence blesses the first foundational stone laid for the new campanile (bell tower) of the Florence Cathedral (the tower was designed by the artist Giotto di Bondone).
 December 30 – Pope Benedict XII succeeds Pope John XXII, as the 197th pope.

 Date unknown 
 Autumn – Battle of Adramyttion: A Christian league defeats the fleet of the Turkish Beylik of Karasi.

Births 
 January 4 – Amadeus VI of Savoy (d. 1383)
 January 13 – King Henry II of Castile (d. 1379)
 May 25 – Emperor Sukō (d. 1398)
 August 30 – King Pedro of Castile (d. 1369)
 date unknown
 King James I of Cyprus (d. 1398)
 Margaret Graham, Countess of Menteith, Scottish noble (d. c. 1380)
 Hayam Wuruk, Javanese ruler (d. 1389)

Deaths 
 January 17 – John of Brittany, Earl of Richmond (b. c. 1266)
 December 4 – Pope John XXII (b. 1249)
 date unknown – Sheikh Safi-ad-din Ardabili of Persia (b. 1251)
 Isabella de Vesci, politically active French noblewoman (b. 1260s)

References